Itumeleng Ntsube (born 9 September 1998) is a South African politician serving as a permanent delegate to the National Council of Provinces from the Free State. He was sworn in as a Member of Parliament at the age of 20 in May 2019 and consequently became the youngest parliamentarian in South African history. Ntsube is a member of the African National Congress (ANC) and the president of Congress of South African Students (Cosas).

Ntsube was born in Botshabelo in the Free State. He matriculated from high school in 2018. He is currently studying towards a degree in education.

References

External links
Mr Itumeleng Ntsube – Parliament of South Africa
Itumeleng Ntsube – People's Assembly

Living people
1998 births
Members of the National Council of Provinces
People from the Free State (province)
Sotho people
People from Bloemfontein
People from Mangaung Metropolitan Municipality
African National Congress politicians